The 2016 Montserrat Championship was the eighth recorded season of the competition. It was the first iteration of the season in nearly 12 years.

The competition was won by Royal Montserrat Police Force.

Final standings

1 Royal Montserrat Police Force

- Ideal SC

- Montserrat Secondary School

- Montserrat Volcano Observatory Tremors

- Seven Day Adventists Trendsetters

References

2016 domestic association football leagues
2016 in Montserrat
Montserrat Championship seasons